Sigas (Nepali: सिगास ) is a Gaupalika(Nepali: गाउपालिका ; gaupalika) in Baitadi District in the Sudurpashchim Province of far-western Nepal. 
Sigas has a population of 21510.The land area is 245.44 km2.

References

Rural municipalities in Baitadi District
Populated places in Baitadi District
Rural municipalities of Nepal established in 2017